d/b/a ADK, formerly known as Asatsu-DK, is a Japanese advertising agency. Headquartered in the Toranomon Hills building complex in Minato, Tokyo since June 2014 (previously in Tsukiji, Chūō, Tokyo), the firm is Japan's third largest advertising agency after Dentsu and Hakuhodo. The agency has 80 offices in over 20 countries. One, Asatsu-DK Europe, was established in 1993 in Amsterdam, Netherlands. Bain Capital has owned the company since 2018.

History
Asatsu Inc. was established in 1956 by Masao Inagaki. In August 1998, it entered a business tie-up with the WPP Group. It soon merged with fellow advertising agency Dai-ichi Kikaku Co., Ltd. (established in 1951) to form Asatsu-DK (the DK stands for Dai-ichi Kikaku) on January 1, 1999. Masao Inagaki died on April 16, 2015. In October 2017, it was reported that U.S. private equity firm Bain Capital was looking to buy Asatsu-DK for ¥152 billion ($1.35 billion).

On January 1, 2019, it was reported that Asatsu-DK fully acquired d-rights. It had previously shared that company with Mitsubishi Corporation.

Controversy 
In October 2022 ADK President Shinichi Ueno was arrested as part of a Prosecutors investigation into bribery. Prosecutors alleged that ADK sent ¥47 million to a former executive of the Tokyo Olympics organizing committee through two different routes in exchange for preferential treatment of sponsorship contracts for the 2020 Tokyo Olympic and Paralympic Games.

Subsidiaries and interests
It owns a variety of interests, including production companies NAS and d-rights; animation studio Eiken; animation studio Gonzo; Nihon Bungeisha Publishing; film and print processor Taiyo Seihan; production studio Sun Artist Studio, Supervision Inc.; television commercial production house Prime Pictures; and creative services company Tokyo Ad Party.

Asatsu-DK is also involved in producing and providing its services to numerous anime series, through itself as well as its subsidiaries, including recent installments of Sunrise's Gundam series, such as the latest series Mobile Suit Gundam 00, Turn A Gundam, Mobile Suit Gundam Seed and Mobile Suit Gundam Seed Destiny, as well as several other anime titles.

References

External links

 Official website

Advertising agencies of Japan
Mass media companies based in Tokyo
Service companies based in Tokyo
Mass media in Tokyo
Japanese companies established in 1956
Marketing companies established in 1956
Mass media companies established in 1956
Bain Capital companies
Anime companies
2018 mergers and acquisitions